The following is a summary of results for general elections in the Northern Territory. The assembly consisted of 19 members at its creation in 1974, but was increased to its present size of 25 for the 1983 election.

The table below shows the total number of seats won by the major political parties at each election. The winning party's total is shown in bold. Full details on any election are linked via the year of the election at the start of the row.

References

See also
 List of Northern Territory by-elections
Timeline of Australian elections

 
Northern Territory
Northern Territory general elections